The Planets, retitled The Planets and Beyond for its second season, is a documentary television series produced by the Science Channel that aired from 2017 to 2019. It explores the planets and of the Solar System, exoplanets, and other astronomical objects.

Format

Former astronaut Mike Massimino hosts the show, appearing briefly to introduce each segment of each episode, and Erik Dellums narrates the series. During its first season, titled The Planets, the series focused on planets exclusively except for a single episode which studied the Moon. Retitled The Planets and Beyond, the series expanded its focus during its second season to include other types of astronomical objects. The Science Channel also broadcast The Planets and The Planets and Beyond specials, some of them made up of original footage and others of segments broadcast previously on The Planets, The Planets and Beyond, How the Universe Works, Space's Deepest Secrets, and Strip the Cosmos.

Episode list 
SOURCES

Season 1 – The Planets (2017) 

{| class="wikitable plainrowheaders"  margin:auto; background:#fff"
|-
! style="background:#dbe9f4; color:#000; text-align:center;"|Episode # 
!! style="background:#dbe9f4; color:#000; text-align:center;"|Title
!! style="background:#dbe9f4; color:#000; text-align:center;"|Directed by
!! style="background:#dbe9f4; color:#000; text-align:center;"|Original air date

{{Episode list
|EpisodeNumber   = Special
|Title           = Saturn: The Cassini Secrets
|DirectedBy      = 
|OriginalAirDate = 
|ShortSummary    = The National Aeronautics and Space Administration (NASA) Cassini spacecraft concludes its 20-year mission to explore Saturn and its moons, and the special unveils what happened during Cassini'''s final moments and details how its discoveries revealed Saturn's deepest secrets.
|LineColor       = dbe9f4
}}

|}

 Season 2 – The Planets and Beyond (2018) 

Special — The Planets and Beyond (2019)

See alsoAlien PlanetCosmos: A Spacetime OdysseyExtreme UniverseHow the Universe WorksInto the Universe with Stephen HawkingMars: The Secret ScienceSpace's Deepest SecretsStrip the CosmosThrough the WormholeThe Universe''

References

External links
 Science Channel's The Planets, "Venus Alien Evidence" on YouTube

2017 American television series debuts
2019 American television series endings
2010s American documentary television series
Documentary television series about astronomy
Science Channel original programming